The 66th Training Squadron is an active unit of the United States Air Force. Its current assignment is with the 336th Training Group at Fairchild Air Force Base where is performs the training for the SERE instructor course for the USAF.

History

World War II
During World War II, the squadron operated primarily in the Southwest Pacific Theater, conveying personnel, dropping parachutists, towing gliders, transporting cargo, munitions and evacuating casualties in numerous campaigns. The squadron earned both the United States Distinguished Unit Citation and the Philippine Presidential Unit Citation for its combat operations.

Air Force reserve
As part of the Air Force Reserve during the postwar years, the squadron performed peacetime transport missions. Ordered to active service during the Korean War, the units' equipment and personnel were reassigned to Far East Air Force active duty units.  It was then inactivated as a paper unit.

Survival training
The 3614th Combat Crew Training Squadron was activated at Clark Air Base, Philippines in April 1971, when Air Training Command assumed responsibility for operating th Jungle Survival School there from Pacific Air Forces.

Lineage
 66th Troop Carrier Squadron
 Constituted as the 66th Troop Carrier Squadron on 7 December 1942
 Activated on 12 December 1942
 Inactivated on 15 January 1946
 Activated in the reserve on 3 August 1947
 Redesignated the 66th Troop Carrier Squadron (Medium) on 27 June 1949.
 Ordered to active service on 1 April 1951.
 Inactivated on 17 April 1951
 Consolidated with the 3614th Combat Crew Training Squadron as the 66th Crew Training Squadron on 1 January 1993

 66th Training Squadron
 Designated as the 3614th Combat Crew Training Squadron
 Organized on 1 April 1971
 Consolidated with the 66th Troop Carrier Squadron as the 66th Crew Training Squadron on 1 January 1993
 Redesignated 66th Training Squadron''' on 1 April 1994

Assignments
 403d Troop Carrier Group, 12 December 1942
 Fifth Air Force, 21 July 1943
 54th Troop Carrier Wing, 13 August 1943
 433d Troop Carrier Group, 9 November 1943
 403d Troop Carrier Group, 20 February 1945 – 15 January 1946
 419th Troop Carrier Group, 3 August 1947
 403d Troop Carrier Group, 27 June 1949 – 17 April 1951
 3636th Combat Crew Training Group (later 336th Crew Training Group, 336th Training Group), 1 April 1971 – present

Stations

 Bowman Field, Kentucky, 12 December 1942
 Alliance Army Air Field, Nebraska, 18 December 1942
 Pope Field, North Carolina, 3 May 1943
 Baer Field, Indiana, 18 June – 6 July 1943
 Port Moresby Airfield Complex, New Guinea, 21 July 1943
 Nadzab Airfield Complex, New Guinea, 25 September 1943 (operated from Tadji Airfield, New Guinea, 12 May – June 1944)

 Mokmer Airfield, Biak, Netherlands East Indies, 18 November 1944 (operated from Hill Field, Mindoro, and Dulag Airfield, Leyte, Philippines after 18 January 1945)
 Wama Airfield, Morotai, Netherlands East Indies, 27 February 1945
 Dulag Airfield, Leyte, Philippines, 15 August 1945 – 15 January 1946
 Roanoke Municipal Airport, Virginia, 3 August 1947
 Portland Municipal Airport, Oregon, 27 June 1949 – 17 April 1951
 Clark Air Base, Philippines, 1 April 1971
 Fairchild Air Force Base, Washington, 4 April 1981 – present

Aircraft
 Douglas C-47 Skytrain, 1943–1945
 Curtiss C-46 Commando, 1944–1945
 Stinson L-5 Sentinel, 1945

References

Notes
 Explanatory notes

 Cittions

Bibliography

 
 
 

Survival training
Training squadrons of the United States Air Force